Rababe Arafi (born 12 January 1991) is a middle-distance runner from Morocco, who specialises in the 1500 metres. Born in Khouribga, she is a three-time medallist at the African Championships in Athletics, having been continental champion in 2012 with a championship record run of 4:05.80 minutes. She holds the Moroccan national record in the mile run and in the 1500m (3:58.84 minutes - 16 June 2019 - Rabat - Diamond League)

Arafi was part of Morocco's team for the 2016 Summer Olympics and was a 1500 m finalist. She represented Morocco at the World Championships in Athletics in 2013, 2015 and 2017, including eighth in the 1500 m at the 2017 World Championships in Athletics. Arafi was initially bronze medallist at 2014 IAAF World Indoor Championships in the 1500 m, but she was later disqualified because she made contact with Heather Kampf resulting in Kampf's fall. She also competed at the IAAF World Cross Country Championships in 2007, but failed to finish the race. She has won gold medals in the 1500 m at the Arab Athletics Championships (2013), Islamic Solidarity Games (2013 and 2017) and the Jeux de la Francophonie (2013 and 2017).

International competitions

1Disqualified in the final

See also
List of champions of the African Championships in Athletics

References

External links 
 
 
 
 

Living people
1991 births
People from Khouribga
Moroccan female middle-distance runners
Moroccan female cross country runners
Olympic athletes of Morocco
Athletes (track and field) at the 2016 Summer Olympics
World Athletics Championships athletes for Morocco
Mediterranean Games gold medalists for Morocco
Mediterranean Games medalists in athletics
Athletes (track and field) at the 2013 Mediterranean Games
Athletes (track and field) at the 2018 Mediterranean Games
Athletes (track and field) at the 2019 African Games
African Games medalists in athletics (track and field)
African Games silver medalists for Morocco
Mediterranean Games gold medalists in athletics
Islamic Solidarity Games competitors for Morocco
Athletes (track and field) at the 2020 Summer Olympics
20th-century Moroccan women
21st-century Moroccan women